William Paine may refer to:

William Paine (physician) (1750–1833), Canadian physician and political figure
William A. Paine (1855–1929), American businessman 
William W. Paine (1817–1882), U.S. Representative from Georgia

See also
William Pain (1855–1924), British Army officer
William Payne (disambiguation)